Gerasimos Xenophon Santas (March 23, 1931 - June 20, 2021) was a Greek-American philosopher and Professor of Philosophy at the University of California, Irvine. A festschrift in his honor was published in 2011.

References

1931 births
2021 deaths
Greek philosophers
Philosophy academics
University of California, Irvine faculty
20th-century American philosophers
American people of Greek descent